The KSShch (tr.:Korabelny snaryad Shchuka (KSShch); , "Shchuka" – pike in English) was a Soviet anti-ship cruise missile design that carried a nuclear warhead. Its GRAU designation is 4K32. It was sometimes referred to as P-1 Strela or Strelka (Little Arrow). It was used in the 1950s and 1960s. The missile's NATO reporting name was SS-N-1 Scrubber. It was tested in 1953–1954 on the destroyer Bedovyy (Kildin-class) and entered service in 1955, being deployed on Kildin- and Krupnyy (later converted to Kanin)-class ships. It was fired from a heavy rail launcher SM-59, with an armoured hangar. As those ships were retrofitted and modernized between 1966 and 1977, the missiles were removed (in favor of the SS-N-2 on the Kildin class and an anti-aircraft/anti-submarine weapons suite on the Kanin class).

Specifications
Total length: 7.6 m (25 ft)
Diameter: 900 mm (3 ft)
Wingspan: 4.6 m (15 ft)
Weight: 3,100 kg (6830 lb)
Warhead: nuclear warhead or High Explosive
Propulsion: liquid-fuel rocket
Range:	
Guidance: inertial guidance
Contractor: NPO Mashinostroenia
Entered service: 1955

Operators 

 
 The Soviet Navy employed the KSShch on Kildin and Kanin class ships.  The missile was withdrawn by 1977.

See also 
 KS-1 Komet
 Saab Rb 08
 P-20 Sokol
 P-40

References

External links
GlobalSecurity.org: SS-N-1 Scrubber accessed March 15, 2004.

Anti-ship cruise missiles of the Soviet Union
Cold War anti-ship missiles of the Soviet Union
Nuclear cruise missiles of the Soviet Union
Cruise missiles of the Cold War
Cold War nuclear missiles of the Soviet Union
Surface-to-surface missiles
Military equipment introduced in the 1950s